A looking glass is an object whose surface reflects an image.

Looking Glass or Lookingglass may also refer to:

Arts and entertainment

Film and television 
 Looking Glass (film), a 2018 thriller film
 Second Chance (2016 TV series), an American science fiction crime drama television series also known as Lookinglass during preproduction
 The Looking Glass, an underwater DHARMA Initiative station in the TV series Lost

Music 
 Looking Glass (band), a 1970s pop music group
 Looking Glass (Looking Glass album), 1972
 Looking Glass (Fay Hield album), 2010
 Looking Glass (EP), a 2008 song, video and EP recording by The Birthday Massacre
 "The Looking Glass" (song), a song by Dream Theater
 "Looking Glass", a song by All Hail the Silence from their 2019 album Daggers
 "Looking Glass", a song by guitarist Allan Holdsworth from his 1986 album, Atavachron
 "Looking Glass", a song by Ashley Tisdale from her 2019 album Symptoms
 "Looking Glass", a song by Yanni from his 1986 album, Keys to Imagination

Written media 
 Looking Glass (series), a novel series created by author John Ringo
 "The Looking-Glass", a short story by Anton Chekhov
 Looking Glass, a DC Comics character, and member of The Blasters

Other 
 Looking Glass Studios, a defunct video game developer
 Lookingglass Theatre Company, based in Chicago, Illinois, U.S.

Computing 
 Looking Glass (UNIX desktop), a commercial desktop environment for UNIX, developed by Visix Software
 Looking Glass server, publicly accessible servers for performing routing queries, used to troubleshoot routing issues across the Internet
 Project Looking Glass, a project aiming to create a 3D desktop, conducted by Sun Microsystems

Places 
 Looking Glass Township, Clinton County, Illinois, United States
 Looking Glass Rock, Transylvania County, North Carolina, United States
 Looking Glass River, Michigan, United States
 Lookingglass, Oregon, Douglas County, Oregon, United States

Other uses 
 Looking Glass (Native American leader) (died 1877), Nez Perce war leader
 Looking glass self, an interactionist sociological concept
 Lookingglass plant, another name for Coprosma repens, small tree or shrub of New Zealand
 Operation Looking Glass, code name for an airborne command center currently operated by the U.S. Navy

See also
 England's Looking Glass, a list of works with England's Looking Glass in the title
 Through the Looking Glass (disambiguation)